Artan Cuku (14 January 1975 - 8 April 2017), was an Albanian Martyr of the Homeland,(Albanian: Dëshmor i Atdheut), who served as the First Director (Albanian: Drejtues i Parë) of the Albanian State Police, First Director of Police, Vlorë County, Head of the Anti-Money Laundering Sector in the General Directorate of the State Police, Vice Director of the Tirana District Police, Vice Director of Berat District Police, Vice Director of Fier District Police, Deputy Director of the Vlora District Police, served in the Sector of Crimes Against the Person in Tirana and the Sector Against Organized Crime, Management Specialist at the Tirana District Police Directorate, Head of the Crime Investigation Section, at Police Station No. 4 in the Tirana Police Directorate, The Sector Against Terrorist Acts in Berat,Chief of Police Station in Tropojë, Head of the Crime Investigation Section at the Durrës Police Station, Head of the Crime Investigation Section at the Shkodër Police Station, also known with the nickname of "The Iron Director",(Albanian: Drejtori I Hekurt), Businessman and founder of the private Security guard service "International Security Albania".

Early life 
Artan Cuku was born on 25.01.1975(he was born in January 14, 1975, but officially in the registry of the civil status of the time it was marked January 25, 1975), in the village of Old Lurë (Albanian: Lurë e vjetër), Dibër district. He was the fourth child of Sulejman and Nurije Cuku. He completed his primary and 8-year education in Lurë Plain (Albanian: Fushe Lurë), while he completed his general secondary education in the city of Peshkopia.After completing secondary education, in the years 1994-1996, he worked as a teacher at the secondary school "Nikoll Kaçorri" Lurë. In 1997-2000, he graduated from the "Arben Zylyftari" Police Academy with excellent results, receiving the title of "Senior Police Specialist".

Career 
In terms of education, Artan Cuku continued, during his career, to complete his Law studies at the Bachelor and Master levels and then took the bar exam where he received the title of "Lawyer", a profession which he never exercised.

He has also successfully completed dozens of different courses and trainings both inside and outside the country, organized by Albanian, European and American Law Enforcement Institutions, during the period 2000-2014.

In September 2000, immediately after graduating from the Police Academy, Artani was appointed to the structures of the State Police, in the Section for the Investigation of Crimes in the Police Station of Malësia e Madhe. At the start of his career, outstanding qualities of an officer with talent and passion, intuition and professional imagination were noticed. This was reflected in the discovery of some old events that required commitment, devotion, persistence, courage and operational and procedural skills. He built the work for the capture of several wanted persons who in those years were many, dangerous, and the police structures still did not have the right image in the public after the events of 1997.

After about a year and a half of experience as a crime investigation specialist in Malesia e Madhe, at the beginning of 2002, based on the admirable results, he was appointed Head of the Crime Investigation Section at the Shkodra Police Station. The city of Shkodër in that period had a pronounced criminality. Only two years had passed since the police building burned down in this city and the situation was totally out of control. It must be said that in this period with the work and dedication of the police team, with the results that were achieved, the balance had shifted to the side of the state police. Crime and criminal groups lost ground in Shkodër and security parameters began to improve. Artan Cuku was one of the prominent and very active protagonists in the turnaround that was achieved with a lot of sacrifice in terms of establishing order in this city. Many dangerous people were caught and many criminal cases were compiled in that difficult time.

At the end of 2002, for the qualities shown in Shkodër, Artani was selected by the officials of the Ministry of Internal Affairs and transferred to the position of Head of the Crime Investigation Section at the Durrës Police Station, a very problematic city at that time. As a coastal country where, in addition to street crime, there was a dynamic activity of traffic and organized crime. Important exponents of crime were hit at that time. Politically connected underworld figures faced a police backlash. Artani was the key man of these actions and therefore in this city the engagements of influential people began to move him from this position. He held this position until 2004 when he was transferred to the farthest northern city.

In 2004 he was appointed Chief of the Tropoja Police Station. For several months, spectacular operations were organized in this city for the capture of highly dangerous persons from Lekbibaj to the farthest ends of the Shkëlzen mountains. In every action led by Artani, there were exchanges of fire, but the triumph of the police structure of the Tropoja police station was indisputable, successful and without injuries from the police ranks. In this period, a great deal of work was done to collect weapons from the population since the period of 1997 had created conditions where everyone had weapons and the risk of criminal events was evident at any moment.

After a few months of service and confrontation in Tropojë, in 2004, he was transferred to Berat in the Anti-Terrorist Acts Sector, where he dealt with the creation of files according to legal procedures and professional standards for all persons identified with a precedent in the sector he covered. At the end of this year, he was appointed Head of the Crime Investigation Section, at Police Station No. 4 in the Tirana Police Directorate. The primary and effective task was the investigation of old events undiscovered until that time. Many criminal events from 1997 onwards were without perpetrators, the files compiled for these events were quite schematic without the proper opportunity to carry out full procedural actions due to the situation at that time. Therefore, priority and great work was done in the re-investigation of these events, documenting and putting before the legal responsibility of the perpetrators for the old crimes committed and this gave a very good image and impact in the community as well as greatly influenced the prevention of other crimes . Artani, as the head of the anti-crime section, was in charge of all actions and the author of all the successes of this Commissariat.

In 2005 from Police Station No. 4, he was transferred and appointed as a Leading Specialist in the Tirana District Police Directorate and then in the years 2006 to 2007 he worked in the Crimes Against the Person Sector in Tirana and then in the Organized Crime Sector . Even in these tasks, his work, commitment and innovation in his actions produced quality results and there was no sensational file that was finalized at that time that did not have the commitment, hand and mind of Artan Cuku.

From the middle of 2007, he was appointed as the Vice Director of the Vlora District Police. The end of 2007 and the year 2008 finds Artan Cukun as Vice Director of the Fier District Police. At the end of 2008 and the beginning of 2009, he was the Vice Director of Berat District Police and then until 2011, Vice Director of the Tirana District Police. For 4 years as Vice Director of police in four Districts he had faced great challenges, the Vice District Director at that time was the highest leader of crime investigation. Artan was sent to the Districts where there were delicate problems that had to be solved and his unsparing commitment gave visible results. In these years, spectacular investigations have been carried out and important operations have been completed. These results and this commitment of the police of this period brought the fulfillment of the standards for Albania's NATO membership and the fulfillment of the standards for the liberalization of visas. Two great and historic achievements for Albania. Undoubtedly, Artan Cuku had his role in the important sectors he led, presenting unimaginable results every week.

After 2011, Artani was transferred to perform the duties of the Head of the Anti-Money Laundering Sector in the General Directorate of the State Police, which he performed for about a year. This was a new direction of Artan's work but a priority of the time for the police. In addition to the extraordinary experience he had in the investigation of serious criminal offenses against life and person as well as criminal offenses related to trafficking's and organized crime, Artani is now familiar with the procedures and legislation of the challenge of the century, that of cleaning the products of criminal offences.

In the beginning of 2012 until the end of 2013, he was in the position of Police First Director of Vlora District. This is the most glorious time for Artan, the best time for the citizens of Vlora. Having on his shoulders this heavy task and the weight of responsibility in the management of the Vlorë District police, Artani and his staff made a marked difference from all other districts in work, results and performance. Spectacular actions were finalized in Vlora, several times the personalities of the Italian police and the Italian ambassador were seen in press conferences alongside the successful First Director Artan Cuku presenting the finalization of the operations that the European partners wanted so much.

At the end of 2013, after the political changes that took place in Albania, Artani was transferred from Vlora and until June 2014 he worked in the Directorate of Strategic Studies in the State Police until he was released from the police without any reason.

He had rare leadership skills as the Albanian police state's Senior director, with nearly 17 years of work experience. He has initiated, directed and managed important investigations within the framework of the fight against organized crime and serious crimes.

His special organizational and managerial skills came as a result of gradual career advancement and continuous professional training, starting from the field "Inspector" level and up to the high police leading rank of "First Director".(Albanian: Drejtues i Parë)

Throughout his career, all work evaluations over the years, which are found in his personal file, have been at the "Excellent and Very good" level.

End of Life 
On 08.04.2017, at 8:00 p.m., he was killed while entering his house on "Rrugën e Kosovarëve, Tirana, a fact for which the Prosecutor's Office for Serious Crimes carried out investigations within Criminal Procedure No. 139/2017 and at the end of the investigations, the prosecution body concluded that his murder was committed at work, due to his Duty, during when he was exercising the functions of the First Director of the Vlora District Police Department, the crime charged under articles 79/b and 25 of the Criminal Code ("Murder of state police officers")

On 09.04.2017, the State Police organized the state tribute ceremony in his honor.

Ratings, Awards and Decorations in chronological order 

1. For high merits, Minister of Internal Affairs with Order no. 464, dated 12.06.2017 awarded Artan Cuku the "Medal of Honor" posthumously with the motivation 'For special merits and services in the fight against crime, ensuring public order and tranquility"

2. The president of the Albanian Republic, Mr. Bujar Nishani, by Decree no. 10532, dated 27.06.2017, decorated Artan Cuku with the "Golden Eagle Decoration" (posthumously) with the motivation "In deep appreciation and respect for the maximum dedication, unparalleled devotion, the rare sacrifice in the uncompromising fight against criminals and organized crime, as a professional and missionary vanguard in the leading ranks of the State Police.

3. Dibër municipality, with decision no. 13, dated 09.02.2018, awarded Artan Cuku the title "Honorary Citizen of Dibër" (posthumously), with the motivation: "For professional values, for high contribution to police structures state, the unparalleled and uncompromising sacrifice in the fight against organized crime as well as the elevation of the moral, historical and noble values of the land of Lura and Dibra".

4. The Central Commission on the Status of "Martyr of the Homeland" with decision no. 770, dated 02.04.2019, declared Artan Cuku "Martyr of the Homeland" and gave his family the symbol "Family of the Martyr of the Homeland"

5. Dibër Disctrict Council,with Decision No. 19 Date 27/06/2019, granted Artan Cuku the title: "Honor of Dibër District" (posthumously) with the motivation:

"For the special human values, the high contribution to the structures of the State Police, the unparalleled and uncompromising sacrifice in the fight against organized crime as well as the elevation of the moral, historical and noble values of the District of Dibra".

6. Dibër Municipal Council with decision No. 82, Date 24.12.2021 names the street "Artan Cuku" the street that starts from "Elez Isufi" Boulevard and continues towards the Museum and ends at the Palace of Culture.

7. Kamëz Municipal Council with decision No. 23, Date 18.02.2022 decided the announcement "Citizen of Honor" with the motivation "For professional values, for his contribution to the State Police Structures, the unparalleled and uncompromising sacrifice in the fight against organized crime as and the elevation of moral and noble values".

8. Kamëz Municipal Council with decision No. 24, dated 18.02.2022 decided to name the Kamëz Palace of Culture "Artan Cuku".

He rests eternally in the National Martyrs Cemetery.

Books 
The murder of the First Leader Artan Cuku is listed as one of the most sensational murders of the Albanian state in the last hundred years and is described in the book "100 most sesational murders in the history of the Albanian state (in all Albanian territories)" of author Roland Qafoku.

Artan Cuku is also included in the book with the 50 most serious murders in the world for state reasons. The book is entitled "Faces of Assassination" ("The face of the killers") compiled by a group of experts from all over the world and published by the prestigious organization "Global Initiative against Transnational Organized Crime" based in Geneva, Switzerland. These 50 murders include executions of state officials in 40 countries from around the world after 2000, one of which is the murder of Artan Cuku.

The figure and personality of Artan Cuku is also described in the book: "PERSONALITIES OF DIBRA (Encyclopedia of Dibra 3)".

Two books were written about Artan Cuku after his death ' Artan Cuku in memoriam" devised and prepared by the former General Director of the State Police Ahmet Prençi in collaboration with journalists, politicians, former lecturers, former superiors, former colleagues of Artan, etc, as well as "Jam pri' Lure" by author Fatos Daci.

References 

Police directors of Albania
2017 deaths
1975 births
20th-century Albanian people
21st-century Albanian people